Glenmaquin railway station served the town of Glenmaquin in County Donegal, Ireland.

The station opened on 1 January 1909 when the County Donegal Railways Joint Committee built the Strabane and Letterkenny Railway from Strabane to Letterkenny.

It closed on 1 January 1960.

Routes

References

Disused railway stations in County Donegal
Railway stations opened in 1909
Railway stations closed in 1960